Acleros leucopyga is a butterfly in the family Hesperiidae. It is found in southern and south-western Madagascar. The habitat consists of forests.

References

Butterflies described in 1877
Erionotini
Butterflies of Africa
Taxa named by Paul Mabille